Shine is the debut Korean extended play by the South Korean singer-songwriter J-Min with the title track of the same name. It was released digitally on July 18, 2014  and physically on July 21, 2014 by S.M. Entertainment.

Trivia 
It was the debut Korean release after J-Min debuted and became active in the Japanese entertainment industry in 2007.

Release 
The mini-album was released digitally at major South Korean music sites such as MelOn, Genie, and Naver Music at noon on July 18, 2014. It was a preview and the entire album was then released 3 days later on July 21, 2014 physically.

The accompanying music video for Shine was then released on J-Min's official website (j-min.smtown.com) and the official YouTube channel of SMTOWN, the nickname for S.M. Entertainment's artists concurrently on July 15, 2014.

Promotions 
Promotions began for Hoo when J-Min started performing it at June 19's broadcast of Mnet's M! Countdown, June 20's broadcast of KBS's Music Bank,  June 21's broadcast of MBC's Music Core and June 22's broadcast of SBS's Inkigayo.

Promotions began for Shine when J-Min started performing it at July 16's broadcast of MBC's Show Champion, July 17's broadcast of Mnet's M! Countdown and July 18's broadcast of KBS's Music Bank. J-Min also performed it at the SM Town Live World Tour IV in Seoul, South Korea and the Japanese version of the song in Tokyo, Japan.

Songwriting 
J-Min participated in the songwriting of tracks 3: If you want, 5: Finally and 6: Secret Letter respectively.

Inspiration 
The music video takes inspiration from the hit film Gravity.

Concept 
Shine is a modern rock song with an upbeat rhythm and showcases J-Min's solid vocals. It is also a refreshing hot summer song, perfect for the season.

Meanwhile, Hoo is an acoustic ballad, being re-arranged after the release of Hero, a soundtrack for the drama Miss Korea.

Track list 
Track in Bold is the title track of the album.

Chart performance

Sales and certifications

Release history

References

External links 
  (channel: S.M. Entertainment)
 Shine album on iTunes

2014 debut EPs
Korean-language EPs